Skomsvoll is a village on the island of Otterøya in the municipality of Namsos in Trøndelag county, Norway.  It is located on the south side of the island, along the Namsenfjorden.  The village of Statland (in neighboring Flatanger municipality) lies across the fjord from Skomsvoll, with the island of Hoddøya nearby.  The main church for the island, Otterøy Church is located in Skomsvoll.

References

Villages in Trøndelag
Namsos